Pillbox may refer to:

 Pill organizer, a container for medicine
 Pillbox hat, a woman's hat with a flat crown, straight upright sides, and no brim
 Pillbox (military), concrete dug-in guard posts
 Pillbox affair, a 1939 British political and military controversy